Patrick J. Monahan (born 10 June 1954) is a judge of the Superior Court of Justice in Toronto, Ontario. Prior to becoming a judge he was the deputy attorney general for the Province of Ontario. He was also previously the vice president academic and provost at York University in Toronto, Canada, as well as an affiliated scholar with the law firm Davies Ward Phillips & Vineberg LLP. From 2003 until July 2009, Monahan was the dean of Osgoode Hall Law School at York University. He has written extensively on constitutional reform and public policy, and served as senior policy advisor to former Ontario premier David Peterson as well as former Ontario attorney general Ian Scott during the Meech Lake Accord negotiations from 1987 to 1990. He has appeared as legal counsel in major public law litigation at the Supreme Court of Canada as well as in lower courts. He was a frequent commentator on constitutional and public policy issues in the national media. He received his LL.B. degree from Osgoode Hall Law School at York University, where he graduated as gold medalist, and an LL.M. degree from Harvard University. On May 19, 2017 Patrick Monahan was appointed by the federal government of Canada as a judge of the Superior Court of Justice in Toronto.

References

Deans of law schools in Canada
Academic staff of York University
Living people
Harvard Law School alumni
Osgoode Hall Law School alumni
Academic staff of the Osgoode Hall Law School
1954 births
Ontario courts